Torno is a comune (municipality) in the Province of Como in the Italian region Lombardy, located about  north of Milan and about  northeast of Como.

Torno borders the following municipalities: Blevio, Carate Urio, Como, Faggeto Lario, Moltrasio, Tavernerio.

Main sights
Sights include:
the Romanesque parish church of St. Tecla. It features a large Gothic rose window, and a portal dating from 1480.
14th century church San Giovanni Battista del Chiodo. The Romanesque bell tower (12th century) has a Renaissance marble portal with numerous friezes, sculptures and statues, attributed to the Rodari brothers.
Villa Pliniana
Villa Plinianina
Villa Tanzi-Taverna, nicknamed Perlasca. 
sanctuary of St. Elizabeth, in the frazione of Montepiatto, at

References

External links
Official website

Cities and towns in Lombardy